Dimeris is a genus of insects belonging to the family Braconidae.

The species of this genus are found in Northern Europe and Northern America.

Species:
 Dimeris mira Ruthe, 1854

References

Braconidae
Braconidae genera